KOXC-LP (107.9 MHz, "Radio Oasis") is a low-power FM non-commercial educational radio station licensed to Oxnard, California. The station is owned by Centro Evangélico Emmanuel, Inc. and airs Spanish-language Christian programming.

External links
 
 

OXC-LP
Radio stations established in 2015
2015 establishments in California
OXC-LP